Welf II may refer to:

 Welf II, Count of Swabia (died in 1030)
 Welf II, Duke of Bavaria (1072–1120)